Anastasia Denisova (born 29 June 1993) is a Belarusian orienteering competitor.

At the 2016 World Orienteering Championships in Strömstad she won a bronze medal in the sprint distance, behind Maja Alm and Judith Wyder, becoming the first Belarusian WOC medalist.

References

External links 
 
 
 

1993 births
Living people
Belarusian orienteers
Female orienteers
Foot orienteers
World Orienteering Championships medalists
Competitors at the 2017 World Games
21st-century Belarusian women
Junior World Orienteering Championships medalists